Konstantinos "Dino" Yannopoulos (December 15, 1919, Athens, Greece – April 6, 2003, Philadelphia, Pennsylvania) was the principal stage director of the Metropolitan Opera between 1945 and 1977. One of his major works was a production of Giacomo Puccini's Tosca with Maria Callas on the title role. He was also the founder of the Athens Music Festival. Also active as an educator, he worked as director of the opera program at the Curtis Institute of Music during the 1970s and was director of the Academy of Vocal Arts in Philadelphia from 1977-1987 and artistic director of the AVA from 1987-1989. He earned degrees from the University of Vienna, the University of Leipzig, and the Mozarteum.

References

1919 births
2003 deaths
Metropolitan Opera people
Greek emigrants to the United States